Saint-Germain-Laval is a commune in the Loire department in central France.

The North American explorer Daniel Greysolon, Sieur du Lhut was born in Saint-Germain-Laval.

Geography
The commune is located in the plain of Forez, in the center of departement of Loire, in the center of France, 35 kilometers south of Roanne, 52 kilometers north-west of Saint-Etienne and 37 kilometers east of Thiers.

It is crossed by the Aix river, a tributary of the Loire which flows less than ten kilometers to the east.
A
The commune is 6 kilometers south of exit 5 of A89 autoroute linking Clermont-Ferrand (Auvergne, 85 km distant) to Saint-Étienne (62 km distant).

Population

Twin towns
Saint-Germain-Laval is twinned with:
  San Germano, Italy

See also
Communes of the Loire department
 Daniel Greysolon, Sieur du Lhut (c. 1639 – 1710), born in Saint-Germain-Laval. He is the namesake of Duluth, Minnesota as well as Duluth, Georgia

References

Communes of Loire (department)

pms:Saint-Germain-Laval